Calgary TELUS Convention Centre is a convention centre in Calgary, Alberta, Canada that was completed in 1974, and was expanded in 2000 with the addition of the north building. The facility offers 122,000 square feet of convention space, over 47,000 square feet of exhibit space, five pre-function areas and 36 meeting rooms.

The main level of the North Building has nine Telus Meeting Rooms adjacent to a large reception area, plus two meeting rooms with a semi-private reception area. The upper level is a large exhibit hall.

The lower level South Building houses the spacious and flexible Macleod Hall, four Macleod Meeting Rooms and a large pre-function area. Four large Chinook Meeting Rooms with a pre-function area occupies the main floor, while the upper level houses nine Glen Meeting Rooms.

See also
List of attractions and landmarks in Calgary

References

External links
 Telus Convention Centre
 Facebook Page
 YouTube

Buildings and structures in Calgary
Buildings and structures completed in 1974
Convention centres in Canada
Telus